Ateny  is a village in the administrative district of Gmina Nowinka, within Augustów County, Podlaskie Voivodeship, in north-eastern Poland.

The village has a population of 40.

References

Ateny